Ontario Island was a glacial feature as lobes of the Laurentide Glaciation receded from southern Ontario.
The glaciation started to retreat approximately 20,000 years ago.  As it retreated its southern edge was ringed by a series of proglacial lakes.  The relatively high ground, west of the Niagara Escarpment formed a large island in these lakes.

References

Glacial landforms
Landforms of Ontario